Río Branco is a city in the Cerro Largo department of northeastern Uruguay, it borders the Brazilian city of Jaguarão, with which it communicates through the Baron of Mauá International Bridge.

Name
The words Rio Branco mean "white river" in Portuguese. However, the name does not refer to any local river; it is a tribute to Brazilian diplomat José Paranhos, Baron of Rio Branco, who negotiated the definitive borders of Brazil and Uruguay. Hence the Portuguese name, instead of Spanish Río Blanco (although the city's name has an acute accent on the first word that is required in Spanish, but absent from the Portuguese spelling).

Geography

The Yaguarón River, which forms the natural border with Brazil, flows along the city's northern limits. Right across the river lies the Brazilian town of Jaguarão, with the Baron of Mauá International Bridge joining the two cities.

History
On 31 August 1915, the villa (town) previously known as Artigas was given its present name by Act of Law 5330. On 1 July 1953, its status was elevated to a ciudad (city) by Act of Law 11,963.

Population
In 2011, Río Branco had a population of 14,604.
 
Source: Instituto Nacional de Estadística de Uruguay

Places of worship
 St. John the Baptist Parish Church (Roman Catholic)

References

External links

INE map of Río Branco

Populated places in the Cerro Largo Department
Cities in Uruguay
Uruguay (geography) articles